Kashi University, formerly Kashgar University and Kashgar Normal College, is a university in Kashgar, Xinjiang, China.

The university is the westernmost university in China. The school was founded in 1962 and was formerly known as Xinjiang Kashgar Teachers College, then Kashgar Normal College, and finally on April 28, 2015 the name was changed to Kashgar University as it was upgraded to university status.

Headmaster is Zhao Gang.

External link 
 Kashgar University 

Universities and colleges in Xinjiang
Kashgar
Educational institutions established in 1962
1962 establishments in China